Arkh may refer to:
 Arkh-e Bozorg
 Arkh-e Kuchek